Zagrad pri Otočcu is a small settlement in the hills north of Otočec in the City Municipality of Novo Mesto in southeastern Slovenia. The area is part of the traditional region of Lower Carniola and is now included in the Southeast Slovenia Statistical Region.

Name
The name of the settlement was changed from Zagrad to Zagrad pri Otočcu in 1953.

References

External links
Zagrad pri Otočcu on Geopedia

Populated places in the City Municipality of Novo Mesto